Yazdelan (also Romanized as Yazdelān; also known as Yazdān and Yazlān) is a village in Kavir Rural District, Kavirat District, Aran va Bidgol County, Isfahan Province, Iran. At the 2006 census, its population was 262, in 65 families.

References 

Populated places in Aran va Bidgol County